Kjeld Steen (18 June 1925 – 21 May 2005) was a Danish boxer. He competed in the men's flyweight event at the 1952 Summer Olympics. At the 1952 Summer Olympics, he lost to Torbjørn Clausen of Norway.

References

1925 births
2005 deaths
Danish male boxers
Olympic boxers of Denmark
Boxers at the 1952 Summer Olympics
Sportspeople from Copenhagen
Flyweight boxers